The county of Saint-Pol (or Sint-Pols) was a county around the French city of Saint-Pol-sur-Ternoise (Sint-Pols-aan-de-Ternas) on the border of Artois and Picardy, formerly the county of Ternois.

For a long time the county belonged to Flanders, and then from the early 11th century until the end of the 12th century it remained in the hands of the Campdavaine Family, before passing to the Châtillon family then the Luxemburg family.

The best-known count was Louis, the constable of Saint-Pol.  He was extradited to Louis XI of France by Charles the Bold, and in 1475 Louis beheaded him for high treason. In 1493, Saint-Pol was transferred to the Holy Roman Empire by the Treaty of Senlis ; in 1537, Emperor Charles V destroyed the capital city. The county was annexed to Artois in 1787 then France in 1790.

List of counts

External links
 

Saint Pol
Flanders